USS Flusser was a schooner captured by the Union Navy during the American Civil War.

She was used by the Union Navy as a storeship whose duty was to supply other Union Navy ships with coal, ammunition, and other necessary provisions.

Service history
Flusser—a  schooner captured from the Confederates in 1864 but never libeled as a prize—was used as a coal hulk and to carry ordnance and stores to ships in the North Carolina sounds. Flusser was sold at Washington, D.C. on 23 September 1865.

References
 

Ships of the Union Navy
Schooners of the United States Navy
Ammunition ships of the United States Navy
Colliers of the United States Navy
American Civil War auxiliary ships of the United States
Stores ships of the United States Navy
Coal hulks